Rae & Christian are an English production duo, consisting of Mark Rae and Steve Christian. They are also founders of the Grand Central Records label.

History
In 1995, Mark Rae fulfilled a long-term dream by founding Grand Central Records in Manchester. He first met sound engineer and producer Steve Christian when they both utilised the same rehearsal space in Ducie House in the Northern Quarter of Manchester. The first meeting took place when Christian, who is the production strength of the duo, walked past Rae's studio and informed him that his music was out of key. The pair embarked on a partnership that has seen them achieve critical and public acclaim for their work 

In an interview with Pride of Manchester, Rae said: 

Naturally, this new act was the first to release records on the Grand Central Records label. Their first release was an EP, Pure Arithmetic, released in June 1995 under the band name First Priority. A year after their emergence, Rae and Christian enlisted the vocal skills of Veba to add a more diverse flavour to their sound. Contributions to the Grand Central Records compilations Frying The Fat and Central Heating attracted attention from the dance music press.

In 1998, they released their debut album as Rae & Christian, Northern Sulphuric Soul.  The Jungle Brothers and Jeru The Damaja both contributed to the album's songs, giving them an edge over other sampling groups of the late 1990s. They undertook a heavy touring schedule, travelling with their own percussionist, double bass player, female vocalist, scratch DJ, saxophone, flute and rhodes players, to complement the skills of Rae behind the deck and Christian on guitar.

At the same time as nurturing other acts on the Grand Central Records label, their production and remixes were utilised by (Lamb, The Pharcyde, Wai Wan) and mainstream stars such as Natalie Imbruglia, Simply Red and The Manic Street Preachers. Their second album, Sleepwalking marked a change in approach, a movement towards more live instrumentation and more varied songwriting partnerships with veteran musicians such as Bobby Womack, Tania Maria and The Congos.

Mark and Steve released their third album in October 2013 and took the new album on the road with varied line ups to match availability with the vocal guests involved. The album was recorded over the previous four years in Yorkshire in Steve Christian's studio with additional recording and writing under taken in Mark Rae's London studio. The album features the following guests: Ed Harcourt, Kate Rogers, DJ Jazzy Jeff, Masta Ace, Mystro, Jake Emlyn, Gita Langley, Diagrams, Mark Foster, Agent 86, Mel Uye Parker and Pete Simpson.

Discography

Studio albums

DJ mix albums
 Blazing the Crop (1999)
 Another Late Night: Rae & Christian (2001)

Remix albums
 Nocturnal Activity (2002)
 Raiding the Vaults (2009)

Charted singles

References

English electronic music duos
English hip hop groups
Musical groups from Manchester
Night Time Stories artists
Record production duos